Biloli is a city and a municipal council in Nanded district  in the state of Maharashtra, India.

Earlier, Biloli covered the areas of present day Dharmabad & Naigaon but now these two are separated from Biloli.

Geography
It has an average elevation of 347 metres (1138 feet).

Demographics
 India census, Biloli had a population of 13,430. Males constitute 52% of the population and females 48%. Biloli has an average literacy rate of 57%, lower than the national average of 59.5%; with male literacy of 65% and female literacy of 48%. 17% of the population is under 6 years of age. The famous temple of Goddess Saraswati ( Basar ) is only 32 km away from the town.

See also
Bilolsai taluka

References

Cities and towns in Nanded district